Gerald B. Kratz (August 8, 1933January 28, 2003) was a Michigan academic and politician.

Early life and education
Kratz was born on August 8, 1933, in Detroit, Michigan. In 1955, Kratz earned a bachelor's degree in education. The next year, Kratz earned a master's degree in education. In 1969, Kratz earned a doctorate degree in education and curriculum development. He earned all three of his degrees form Wayne State University.

Career
Kratz served as superintendent of the Novi School District from 1972 to 1980. Kratz served as superintendent of the Jackson County Intermediate School District from 1980 to 2001. Kratz served as an adjunct professor at Eastern Michigan University from 1973 to 2003. Kratz, along with David Steel, owned the private firm Educational Associates. In March 2000, the Litchfield City Council hired Educational Associates conduct a search for a new city manager. On March 8, 2000, Steel and Kratz interviewed dozens Litchfield residents to find out what they were looking for in a new city manager. By March 13, 2000, the city council had received 37 applications for the city manager position. That same day, Steel and Kratz presented to the city council the brochure, which was to be sent to applicants. The brochure explained the position's duties and the qualities sought by the residents of Litchfield, based on their research. Kratz also worked as a real estate site agent.

On November 5, 2002, Kratz was elected to the Michigan House of Representatives seat representing the 65th district. In the state house, Kratz was a member of the House Apportions Committee and was head of the committee which handled the budget for the state's community colleges. Kratz introduced six bills during his political career. One of them sought to lower the legal level for drunk driving. He served as state representative from January 1, 2003, to his death on January 28, 2003.

Personal life
During his time in legislature, Kratz resided in Grass Lake, Michigan. Kratz was married to Eleanor. Together, they had four children. Kratz was Catholic.

Death
Kratz died of a heart attack on January 28, 2003, while working out on a treadmill in Grass Lake. In the special election to fill the vacancy in the 65th district left by his death, Republican Mickey Mortimer defeated Jerry Kratz's son, Democrat Kent Kratz.

Electoral history

References

1933 births
2003 deaths
Catholics from Michigan
Eastern Michigan University faculty
Republican Party members of the Michigan House of Representatives
People from Grass Lake, Michigan
Politicians from Detroit
Wayne State University alumni
20th-century American educators
21st-century American educators
21st-century American politicians